The State Bank of Pakistan women's cricket team is a Pakistani women's cricket team, sponsored by the State Bank of Pakistan. They competed in the National Women's Cricket Championship, the Women's Cricket Challenge Trophy and the Departmental T20 Women's Championship between 2016 and 2018–19.

History
State Bank of Pakistan first competed in the Women's Cricket Challenge Trophy in 2015–16, in which they qualified for the final after finishing second in the group of five. The side lost in the final to Zarai Taraqiati Bank Limited by 70 runs. In the following season's Challenge Trophy, 2016–17, State Bank of Pakistan again reached the final, and again lost to Zarai Taraqiati Bank Limited.

State Bank of Pakistan also competed in the National Women's Cricket Championship in 2016 and 2017. The side reached the final in 2016, after winning Pool C and finishing second in the Super League round, but lost in the final to Zarai Taraqiati Bank Limited. In 2017, the side finished third in the Departmental section of the tournament, with one win from their three matches.

In the 2018 and 2018–19 seasons, State Bank of Pakistan competed in the Departmental T20 Women's Championship. They finished third in the group of four in 2018, whilst they reached the final in 2018–19, but again lost out to Zarai Taraqiati Bank Limited.

Players

Notable players
Players who played for State Bank of Pakistan and played internationally are listed below, in order of first international appearance (given in brackets):

 Asmavia Iqbal (2005)
 Sumaiya Siddiqi (2007)
 Sadia Yousuf (2008)
 Marina Iqbal (2009)
 Kainat Imtiaz (2010)
 Sidra Ameen (2011)
 Elizebath Khan (2012)
 Javeria Rauf (2012)
 Iram Javed (2013)
 Anam Amin (2014)
 Maham Tariq (2014)
 Sidra Nawaz (2014)
 Aliya Riaz (2014)
 Ayesha Zafar (2015)
 Muneeba Ali (2016)
 Ghulam Fatima (2017)
 Natalia Pervaiz (2017)
 Fareeha Mehmood (2018)
 Omaima Sohail (2018)
 Kaynat Hafeez (2019)

Seasons

National Women's Cricket Championship

Women's Cricket Challenge Trophy

Departmental T20 Women's Championship

Honours
 National Women's Cricket Championship:
 Winners (0):
 Best finish: Runners-up (2016)
 Women's Cricket Challenge Trophy
 Winners (0):
 Best finish: Runners-up (2018–19)
 Departmental T20 Women's Championship
 Winners (0):
 Best finish: Runners-up (2015–16 & 2016–17)

See also
 State Bank of Pakistan cricket team

References

Women's cricket teams in Pakistan